Tennessee Coal, Iron & Railroad Co. v. Muscoda Local No. 123, 321 U.S. 590 (1944), was an important decision of the United States Supreme Court with regard to the interpretation of the Fair Labor Standards Act (FLSA).  This set a precedent for an expansive construction of the language of the FLSA.

Facts
Three iron ore companies filed a declarative action to determine whether time spent by their employees traveling underground to their work sites constituted employment for which compensation was due under the FLSA.  The district court found that this transit time was work, and the appellate court affirmed its holding as to travel time.

Judgment
The Court, in an opinion written by Justice Murphy, held that the  miners' travel time constituted "work" under the Fair Labor Standards Act, entitling them to pay for such time.  The Court stated that the Fair Labor Standards Act is a “remedial and humanitarian” statute, which “must not be interpreted or applied in a narrow, grudging manner.”  Congress intended the Act to mandate either regular or overtime compensation for all work activities.

Concurring opinions
Justices Jackson and Frankfurter each wrote a short concurrence.  Both argued that the determination of the trial court that the miners' travel time was part of their workweek was an issue of fact that should be affirmed unless clear error was present.

Dissenting opinion
Justice Roberts dissented in an opinion joined by Chief Justice Stone.  Viewing the court's interpretation of the FLSA as overly expansive, Justice Roberts emphasized the importance of interpreting what is written in a statute, rather than what the court wishes is in the statute.

See also
 Fair Labor Standards Act
 Jewell Ridge Coal Corp. v. United Mine Workers of America
 List of United States Supreme Court cases, volume 321
 List of United States Supreme Court cases by the Stone Court

References

External links

United States Supreme Court cases
United States Supreme Court cases of the Stone Court
United States labor case law
1944 in United States case law
Tennessee Coal, Iron and Railroad Company
United Mine Workers of America litigation
Commuting